Memorial Gym is a 2,200-seat multi-purpose arena in Grambling, Louisiana. It is home to the Grambling State University Tigers volleyball team. It was the former home of the men's and women's basketball teams.

References

College volleyball venues in the United States
Defunct college basketball venues in the United States
Indoor arenas in Louisiana
Sports venues in Grambling, Louisiana
Volleyball venues in Louisiana
Grambling State Tigers women's volleyball
Grambling State Tigers men's basketball
Grambling State Tigers women's basketball
1970 establishments in Louisiana
Sports venues completed in 1970